Dil Jo Na Keh Saka is a 2017 Indian Hindi-language romantic drama film starring Himansh kohli and Canadian actress Priya Banerjee. The trailer of the film was released on 26 October 2017. The film has been directed by Naresh Lalwani and was released worldwide on 17 November 2017. The film has been shot entirely in Shimla.

Plot
The story revolves around two childhood friends Jai and Sia, played by Himansh Kohli and Priya Banerjee, who go separate ways in pursuit of their respective dreams. When they return to their hometown and meet after a long separation they understand that their relationship is more than just friendship.

Cast
 Himansh Kohli as Jay
 Priya Banerjee as Sona / Siya
 Manoj Pahwa as Veer
 Farida Dadi as Beeji
 Navni Parihar as Saroj
 Deepika Amin as Karuna Kapoor
 Kenneth Desai as Adv. Ramesh Kapoor
 Asheish Roy as Ujjwal
 Bhuvnesh Mann as Kabir
 Swati Bakshi as Shine
 Jashanpreet Singh Kohli as Sukhi
 Diksha Juneja as Natasha

Soundtrack

The music of the film is composed by Shail-Pritesh while the lyrics have been penned by A. M. Turaz, Devshi Khanduri and Sandeep Singh Kamboj. The first song of the film titled as "Bandh Khwabon Ki" sung by Shail Hada was released on 31 October 2017. The second song of the film "Tanha Tanha" which is sung by Jubin Nautiyal and Aditi Paul was released on 3 November 2017. The third single to be released was "Band Vyah Da Baje" which is sung by Divya Kumar and Pratibha Singh Baghel was released on 6 November 2017. The soundtrack was released by T-Series on 7 November 2017.

Production
This is actress Priya Banerjee's second role as a lead in a Hindi film. The film has been shot extensively in Shimla.

The music of Dil Jo Na Keh Saka has been composed by Shail Hada and Pritesh Mehta.

The film will be released by PVR Pictures.

References

External links
 
 

2017 films
2010s Hindi-language films
Indian romantic drama films
2017 romantic drama films